Fort Osage is a 1952 American Cinecolor Western film directed by Lesley Selander and starring Rod Cameron, Jane Nigh and Morris Ankrum. The film takes its name from the historical Fort Osage.

The film's sets were designed by the art director Dave Milton.

Plot

Partial cast
 Rod Cameron as Tom Clay 
 Jane Nigh as Ann Pickett 
 Morris Ankrum as Arthur Pickett 
 Douglas Kennedy as George Keane 
 John Ridgely as Henry Travers 
 William Phipps as Nathan Goodspeed  
 Myron Healey as Martin Christensen  
 I. Stanford Jolley as Sam Winfield  
 Lane Bradford as Henchman Rawlins  
 Dorothy Adams as Mrs. Winfield  
 Iron Eyes Cody as Osage Brave - Blue Shirt 
 Francis McDonald as Osage Chief 
 Barbara Woodell as Martha Whitley

References

Bibliography
 Alan Gevinson. Within Our Gates: Ethnicity in American Feature Films, 1911-1960. University of California Press, 1997.

External links
 

1952 films
1952 Western (genre) films
American Western (genre) films
Films set in Missouri
1950s English-language films
Films directed by Lesley Selander
Films produced by Walter Mirisch
Cinecolor films
Monogram Pictures films
1950s American films